Greetings from Timbuk3 is the debut album by American band Timbuk 3, released in 1986. The album contains their only charting single, "The Future's So Bright, I Gotta Wear Shades", which reached number 19 on the US Billboard Hot 100.

The songs "Life Is Hard" and "Shame on You" were used in the 1986 film The Texas Chainsaw Massacre 2 and were included on the film's accompanying soundtrack album.

Critical reception
Trouser Press called Greetings from Timbuk3 "surely one of the darkest albums ever to have yielded a hit single."

Track listing
All songs written by Pat MacDonald, except where noted. Copyright Mamdadaddi Music/I.R.S. Music, Inc. admin. by Atlantic Music. (All Songs BMI).

 "The Future's So Bright, I Gotta Wear Shades" – 3:21
 "Life Is Hard" – 4:08
 "Hairstyles and Attitudes" – 2:51
 "Facts About Cats" – 3:16
 "I Need You" – 3:50
 "Just Another Movie" – 4:16
 "Friction" – 3:44
 "Cheap Black & White" – 2:54
 "Shame On You" – 5:04 (Barbara K. MacDonald, Pat MacDonald)
 "I Love You in the Strangest Way" – 2:41

Personnel
Musicians
Barbara K. MacDonald – co-lead vocals on tracks 1, 5, 10, lead vocals on tracks 4, 9, backing vocals, keyboards, synthesizers, electric, 12-string and acoustic guitars, bass, drums, percussion, harmonica, violin, mandolin
Pat MacDonald – co-lead vocals on tracks 1, 5, 10, lead vocals on tracks 2, 3, 6, 7, 8, backing vocals, keyboards, synthesizers, electric, 12-string and acoustic guitars, bass, drums, percussion, harmonica, violin, mandolin

Production
Produced by Dennis Herring
Engineers: Dennis Herring and Mark Teston

Charts

References

1986 debut albums
Timbuk 3 albums
I.R.S. Records albums
Albums produced by Dennis Herring